Espie Dods House is a heritage-listed detached house at 97 Wickham Terrace, Spring Hill, City of Brisbane, Queensland, Australia. It was designed by architect Robin Dods for his brother Espie Dods and was built . It is also known as "Ritas at Dods House Restaurant" and "i Central". It was added to the Queensland Heritage Register on 21 October 1992.

History 

The house was commissioned for Dr Espie Dods by his mother and built next to the family home owned by his stepfather, Dr Charles Ferdinand Marks. It was designed by Dods's brother Robin Dods, the well known architect, as a townhouse and surgery. Although Dods lived in the house for only a few years before moving up the hill to Callender House, the property remained in the Marks family's possession and was let as a residence and surgery to a series of doctors until it was sold as part of the Marks' property for redevelopment. The Marks' home and huge weeping fig tree were demolished in 1982 and replaced with the Silverton office tower, and Dods House was converted into a restaurant as part of the forecourt development.

Description 

The house is solid brick with roughcast render, the Federation era design influenced by the Arts and Crafts movement. It is built on two levels, the ground floor facing Wickham Terrace, and a full subfloor which was formerly exposed as the land fell away toward the rear of the house. The front elevation is dominated by a gabled projection with a window bay. A small porch with an oval window nestles in the angle. The masonry fence with turned timber balusters complements the house. The roof is tiled in terracotta shingle tiles and features a blind dormer which is louvered and glazed.

The house had a long wing extending back from the square core. A verandah, and a double width verandah room or a piazza, extended into the yard between the wing and the core on both levels. Internally, the entry features a black and white marble floor and timber wall panelling. Elsewhere, the walls are lined in plaster with substantial joinery in silky oak. Some ceilings are lath and plaster while others, in particular the dining room are timber.

Four fireplaces are located at the front and rear of the building. Originally, the ground floor housed a doctor's consulting room, drawing room and bedrooms, while the dining room, kitchen and servants' rooms were located on the subfloor.

The layout has been retained in the restaurant, with eating areas on the ground level and the dining room used for large functions. The kitchen has been enlarged, extending back in place of the verandah and piazza, and the ground level verandah now opens out onto the cocktail bar.

Heritage listing 
Espie Dods House was listed on the Queensland Heritage Register on 21 October 1992 having satisfied the following criteria.

The place is important in demonstrating the evolution or pattern of Queensland's history.

The significance of the house lies in its use, building style and family associations. It is a rare surviving example of a combined doctor's residence and surgery which was once commonplace on Wickham Terrace. The only other extant examples are Bryntirion, which is still a residence, and Callender House which was also occupied by Dr Espie Dods and renovated by his architect brother Robin Dods.

The house reflects Robin Dods' Scottish training and contemporary "Arts and Crafts" design trends which he fused with vernacular elements to create an unusual and innovative design. This was unlike any of his other domestic work and used materials and features uncommon in Queensland houses of the Federation period.

That the place is still known as Dods House testifies to the strong public association which exists between the building and its designer and first owner. Robin Dods was a prolific and respected architect in Brisbane and then Sydney.

The place demonstrates rare, uncommon or endangered aspects of Queensland's cultural heritage.

The significance of the house lies in its use, building style and family associations.

It is a rare surviving example of a combined doctor's residence and surgery which was once commonplace on Wickham Terrace. The only other extant examples are Bryntirion, which is still a residence, and Callender House which was also occupied by Dr Espie Dods and renovated by his architect brother Robin Dods.

The place is important in demonstrating a high degree of creative or technical achievement at a particular period.

The significance of the house lies in its use, building style and family associations.

The house reflects Robin Dods' Scottish training and contemporary "Arts and Crafts" design trends which he fused with vernacular elements to create an unusual and innovative design. This was unlike any of his other domestic work and used materials and features uncommon in Queensland houses of the Federation period.

The place has a special association with the life or work of a particular person, group or organisation of importance in Queensland's history.

The significance of the house lies in its use, building style and family associations.

That the place is still known as Dods House testifies to the strong public association which exists between the building and its designer and first owner. Robin Dods was a prolific and respected architect in Brisbane and then Sydney.

References

Attribution

External links

Queensland Heritage Register
Heritage of Brisbane
Spring Hill, Queensland
Houses in Brisbane
Restaurants in Queensland
Articles incorporating text from the Queensland Heritage Register
Houses completed in 1906
Robin Dods buildings
1906 establishments in Australia